Paloma Adams-Allen is a Jamaican-American foreign policy advisor who has served as the deputy administrator of the United States Agency for International Development (USAID) for management and resources in the Biden administration since October 2021.

Early life and education 
Adams-Allen was born and raised in Jamaica. She earned a Bachelor of Arts degree in development studies from Brown University, a Master of International Affairs from Johns Hopkins University, and a Juris Doctor from the Georgetown University Law Center.

Career 
From 1998 to 2000, Adams-Allen was the director of the Caribbean and Central America Action's financial services program. She was then a summer law associate at Coudert Brothers. In 2000, she joined the Organization of American States, serving as a senior advisor and regional manager. In 2010, she joined the United States Agency for International Development, serving as a senior advisor for Latin America and the Caribbean and later associate deputy administrator for the same region. From 2016 to 2017, she was the senior director of private sector partnerships at Winrock International. In April 2017, she became the president of the Inter-American Foundation.

Biden administration
On June 3, 2021, President Joe Biden nominated Adams-Allen to be the deputy administrator of USAID. The Senate Foreign Relations Committee held hearings on Adams-Allen's nomination on July 20, 2021. The committee favorably reported her nomination to the Senate floor on August 4, 2021. Adams-Allen was confirmed by the entire Senate on October 5, 2021, by a vote of 79-20.

Adams-Allen assumed office on October 12, 2021.

Personal life
Adams-Allen lives in Washington D.C with her husband and two daughters.

References 

21st-century Jamaican women politicians
21st-century Jamaican politicians
Brown University alumni
Johns Hopkins University alumni
Georgetown University Law Center alumni
Organization of American States people
People of the United States Agency for International Development
Trump administration personnel
Biden administration personnel

Living people
Year of birth missing (living people)